The Balanstraße is a street in Munich which begins at the Rosenheimer Platz and runs in a southerly direction through the districts Haidhausen, Giesing and Ramersdorf to the district of Fasangarten. It ends at the border road directly on the city boundary to the municipality Neubiberg in the district of Munich.

Description 
The Balanstraße is, except for a small section between the Rosenheimer Platz and the Metzstraße where it is a one-way street about 30 m long, passable in both directions with one lane in each direction. Between Fasangartenstraße and Grenzstraße it only has one lane for both directions.

Bicycle paths run almost continuously along it.

History 
The street was named in 1880 after the French town of Balan near Sedan in the Ardennes. Where in 1870, the Battle of Sedan (Prussia v. France) took place, in which regiments of the Bavarian army alongside of Prussia took part. Since 1867, its previous official name was "Irrenweg" because of the Kreisirrenanstalt Munich located there since 1859 (until 1900, since 1919 it is the Salesianum for disadvantaged young people). After several residents had successfully protested against the streets name, it was renamed in favor of "glorious memories for the Bavarian army, especially for the Munich Regiments".

Road access 
The stop Balanstraße at the "Mittlerer Ring" serves the bus lines 59, 139 and 145. The line 59 crosses the Balanstraße. The line 139 comes from the Chiemgaustraße ("Mittlerer Ring") onto the Balanstraße in the southern direction and leaves it again on the Hochäckerstraße. The line 145 comes from the Claudius-Keller-Straße and follows the Balanstraße to Fasangartenstraße. Line 54 departs from Orleansstraße onto Balanstraße and follows it to Werinherstraße. Slightly different from the daily lines are the associated night bus lines.

Public facilities 
 Chamber of Commerce and Industry for Munich and Upper Bavaria on Balanstraße 55 to 59
 Integrative Montessori School on Balanstraße 73 (German Engagement Award 2015)
 Daycare, Hort and elementary school (the elementary school was also a secondary school until 1996) on Balanstraße 153, 1960 by architect Harald Roth
 Municipal vocational school for vocational preparation at Balanstraße 208

Historical buildings 
On the Balanstraße are mainly residential buildings. The house numbering goes to number 395.

There are fourteen historical buildings in the northern part of Balanstraße:

 House number 4, around 1890 to 1900, Neo-Baroque
 House number 11, around 1870 to 1880
 House number 12, built between 1890 and 1900, it houses the restaurant Simplicissimus of the Augustiner-Bräu
 House number 14, around 1900; notice the two bay windows
 House number 15, around 1870 to 1880
 House number 16, around 1900, Schweifgiebel, corner Rablstraße, in it is the tavern KlinglWirt of Löwen and Paulaner-Bräus
 House number 17, early 1900
 House number 19 and 21, around 1890, Neo-Baroque
 House number 23, together with Pariser Strasse 1, around 1898, Neo-Baroque, founding site of the Münchner Kleinkunstbühne Theater Drehleier by Beppi Bachmair, Uwe Kleinschmidt and Werner Winkler from 1976 to 1997
 House number 29, around 1890 to 1900, Neo-Baroque
 House numbers 33 and 35, around 1890 to 1900, Neo-Baroque
 House number 47, corner house, from 1895

At the Balanstraße 20, corner Barnabasstraße, stands the tower of the original parish church of St. Wolfgang by Hans Schurr (1920).

In 1963, Klaus Backmund designed a fish fountain in front of Balanstraße 73.

The church of Isaiah in Obergiesing from 1966 has the number 361.

Various 
The street is eponymous for the district Balanstraße West in the district of Ramersdorf-Perlach, which is also referred to as Ramersdorf South or Nußdorf. The district is bounded in the west and south by the route of the S-Bahn line to Kreuzstraße. There, the Balanstraße crosses the S-Bahn at a limited level crossing.

The television series Die Hausmeisterin, which was produced in three seasons with a total of 23 episodes, each 45 minutes long, for Bayerischer Rundfunk between 1987 and 1992 and was broadcast in the evening program of the Das Erste and in the third program of the Bavarian Television, it takes place in the old rental building on Balanstraße 19 in the Munich district Haidhausen.

The television series Polizeiinspektion 1 used the residential house Balanstraße 37 as a police station.

References 

Streets in Munich
Buildings and structures in Munich
Munich U-Bahn